Melaleuca sieberi is a shrub or tree in the myrtle, family Myrtaceae, which is endemic to coastal areas of New South Wales and Queensland. It is a large shrub or small tree with papery bark on the trunk, small, sharp leaves and small heads of fluffy flowers in spring. It should not be confused with Callistemon sieberi. When the callistemons were moved to Melaleuca, Callistemon sieberi became Melaleuca paludicola.

Description
The leaves are often  covered with short, soft hairs, especially when young.

The flowers are white or pinkish, arranged in spikes on the ends of branches which continue to grow after flowering. The flower buds are woolly. The stamens are arranged in five bundles around the flowers and each bundle contains 11 to 25 stamens.

Taxonomy
Melaleuca sieberi was first formally described in 1843 by Johannes Conrad Schauer in Repertorium Botanices Systematicae. The specific epithet (sieberi) honours Franz Sieber who collected 645 plant specimens in the Sydney area in the early 1800s.

Distribution and habitat
Melaleuca sieberi occurs in coastal areas of New South Wales north of Gosford to near Maryborough in Queensland growing in coastal heath in sand.

References

sieberi
Flora of Queensland
Plants described in 1843
Taxa named by Johannes Conrad Schauer